Khan Ataur Rahman (known as Khan Ata; 11 December 1928 – 1 December 1997) was a Bangladeshi film actor, director, producer, screenplay writer, music composer, and singer, best known for his role in the film Jibon Theke Neya (1970). He received the Bangladesh National Film Award for Best Screenplay for the films Sujon Sokhi (1975) and Danpite Chhele (1980). He  was awarded Ekushey Padak posthumously in 2003 by the Government of Bangladesh.

Early life and education
The son of Ziarat Hossain Khan and Zohra Khatun, who lived in Singair Upazila, Manikganj District, Rahman was born on 11 December 1928. When he was a student in class three, he won the first prize of the Dhaka Zilla Music Competition. He rendered the song Mon paban-er dinga baiyya.

Rahman attended Dhaka Collegiate School, Dhaka College, and Dhaka University, completing a Bachelor of Science degree. Rahman was extremely obsessed with films. After enrolling in Dhaka Medical College, a career he later decided not to pursue, he made an attempt to escape from the family home and join the film industry. He had only Taka 60 in his possession at the time. His brother-in-law spotted Rahman in the Rail Station and he was forced to return home.

As a result of Rahman's bohemian attitudes, he left Dhaka University in 1949 and ran away from home for the second time. This time he went to Bombay (present-day Mumbai). He started frequented the film industry and slept on the side walks. He met Jyoti Studio's cameraman Jal Irani, who gave Rahman the chance to work as an apprentice but it was not satisfying enough for him.

Career
In 1950, Rahman went to Karachi and took a job as a News Presenter for Radio Pakistan. Here he met with another notable Bengali media personality, Foteh Lohani. At this time, Khan Ata started taking music lessons from renowned Pakistani Sarnagi player Jawahari Khan. After some days Foteh Lohani moved to London. In 1952, Khan Ata went to London as well. There he performed as a singer and actor in several Bengali programs. He met with artist SM Sultan and helped him with his savings to buy art supplies. Rahman and his companions also made arrangements for displaying and selling Sultan's paintings.

In 1953, Rahman enrolled in the Theatre department at City Literary Institute. Rahman studied in the Netherlands when he was awarded a UNESCO fellowship in 1954. Thereafter, he worked as a teacher in London but also took to the stage for several years. In 1956, he returned home and starred in a film called Jago Hua Severa directed by AJ Karder. He played many roles with notable Bengali actress Tripti Mitra.

In 1963, Rahman made his directorial debut with the film Anek Diner Chena, and continued making many notable films like Nawab Sirajuddaula (1967), Sat Bhai Champa (1968), Arun Barun Kironmala (1968), Abar Tora Manush Ho (1973), Sujon Sokhi (1975), Ekhono Onek Raat (1997).

In addition to acting, Rahman was a songwriter with over 500 compositions, some of which remain popular.

Personal life
Rahman married three times. When he was in London, completing a higher course in Cinematography, he met an Englishwoman named Shirley and married her. On their return to Bangladesh and after having a child, they got divorced. Shirley returned to London with the child. Then Khan Ata married Mahbuba Rahman. They met in a radio station. They had a daughter named Rumana Islam, a Bangladeshi singer. In 1968, Rahman married Nilufar Yasmin, a Bangladeshi singer. They had a son, Agun, who is also a Bangladeshi singer.

Filmography

As director

As actor

As composer

Awards
 Pakistan Film Festival Award
 Nigar Award
 International film festival awards at Moscow and Tashkent
 Bangladesh National Film Award for Best Screenplay (1975, 1980)
 Bangladesh National Film Award for Best Lyrics (1980) 
 Ekushey Padak (2003)

References

Footnotes

Bibliography

External links

1928 births
1997 deaths
People from Manikganj District
Dhaka College alumni
Dhaka Medical College alumni
20th-century Bangladeshi male actors
Bangladeshi film directors
Bangladeshi male film actors
20th-century Bangladeshi male singers
20th-century Bangladeshi singers
University of Dhaka alumni
Best Screenplay National Film Award (Bangladesh) winners
Recipients of the Ekushey Padak
Best Lyricist National Film Award (Bangladesh) winners
Best Music Director National Film Award (Bangladesh) winners
Best Music Composer National Film Award (Bangladesh) winners
20th-century screenwriters
Dhaka Collegiate School alumni